Nazi Abad is a neighborhood to the south of the central district of the city of Tehran in Iran. Nazi Abad is one of the relatively lower-income neighborhoods. 

This neighborhood was named "Nazi Abad", after the original "Naz Abad" neighborhood during the Qajar Dynasty.

Most famous people who have lived in this area are famous footballer Hamid Reza Estili (Persian: حميد استیلی), actor Akbar Abdi (Persian: اکبر عبدی), Fereshteh Karimi (Persian:فرشته کریمی) Footballwoman, Yahya Golmohammadi (Persian:یحیی گل محمدی) Football coach, and Meysam Nassiri (Persian: میثم نصیری) Wrestler.

References

https://www.instagram.com/naziabad/

Neighbourhoods in Tehran